Maiden Law is a small village in County Durham, England. It is situated to the north of Lanchester, on the road to Annfield Plain.

References

Villages in County Durham